Krista Lynn Donnenwirth (born June 12, 1989) is an All-American softball player. She attended Capistrano Valley High School. After graduating from high school, she went on to attend Arizona State University, where she plays shortstop and third base.

Early life and family
Born in Torrance, California, Donnenwirth is the daughter of Bill Donnenwirth and Sarah Donnenwirth.  She has one older brother, Dana Donnenwirth. At a young age Donnenwirth and her family moved to Mission Viejo, California where they still reside today. She attended Capistrano Valley High School where she played softball and basketball. Donnenwirth lettered in both sports, but she excelled at softball, winning the league MVP and making All-CIF First Team.

Arizona State softball career
During the 2008 season she was named NFCA Third-Team All-American, First-Team All-Pac-10 and Pac-10 Newcomer of the Year after posting a .354 batting average, fifteen home runs, 74 RBIs, 37 runs and a .632 slugging percentage in leading the Sun Devils to the 2008 National Championship, the team's first NCAA title. Donnenwirth delivered a dominating performance during game one of the 2008 NCAA Championship Series, going 3-for-3 and driving in all three Sun Devil runs in a 3–0 shutout victory over Texas A&M.

During the 2009 season she posted a .322 batting average, nine home runs, 47 RBIs, 31 runs and a .523 slugging percentage.

In the 2010 season, she made her season debut on February 26, 2010, going 0 for 4 with a strikeout and a sacrifice bunt in an 8–7 win over South Florida. She finished the 2010 season with a .307 batting average, five home runs, 25 RBIs, 24 runs and a .443 slugging percentage.

During the 2011 season she posted a .328 batting average, seven home runs, 54 RBIs, 31 runs and a .503 slugging percentage in leading the Sun Devils to the 2011 National Championship. In the first game of the final series against Florida, Donnenwirth hit two home runs leading the Sun Devils to a 14–4 victory. In the final game of her college career, Donnenwirth went 1 for 3 with a walk, as Arizona State clinched the 2011 title with a 7–2 victory over Florida.

Arizona State education
Donnenwirth graduated in 2012, receiving both a Bachelor of Science in Nutrition and Bachelor of Arts in Psychology

Personal life
On October 10, 2009, Donnenwirth was arrested by Mesa Police and charged with driving under the influence after being involved in a two-car crash in which she was accused of hitting another car that had been sitting at a red light. Her blood alcohol content was measured at 0.14, above the Arizona legal limit of 0.08. The original incident report stated that Donnenwirth was cooperative during the on-scene investigation and that she informed the officers she was an Arizona State softball player. Following the incident, Donnenwirth was suspended indefinitely by Arizona State coach Clint Myers for violating team rules. She was later reinstated and returned to the team after missing the first 11 games of the 2010 season.

Career statistics

References

External links 
 Krista Donnenwirth on Facebook
 Krista Donnenwirth: Arizona State player biography

1989 births
Living people
Arizona State Sun Devils softball players
Sportspeople from Torrance, California
Softball players from California
Sportspeople from Mission Viejo, California